Ḥanan (חנן) is a name of Biblical Hebrew origin. In Hebrew it is a masculine name, of the meaning "gracious", "gracious gift" or "grace". In Arabic it means "compassion". The name John is speculated to derive, via Latin and Greek, from the Hebrew name Yehoḥanan or Yoḥanan meaning "Yahweh is gracious". The word 'ḥanan' is exclusively mentioned in the Qur'an while describing Prophet Yahya (John the Baptist) in Surah Maryam 19:12-13. The name Ḥanan is mentioned many times in the bible.

Notable people with this name include:
 Hanan ben Hanan,  Herodian-era High Priest of Israel in Jerusalem
 Hanan of Iskiya, rector of the Talmudical academy at Pumbedita
 Hanan the Egyptian, 2nd century tannaic sage
 Hanan bar Rava, 3rd century amoraic sage
 Hanan Mohamed Abdelrahman, mathematician
 Hanan Saeed Mohsen al-Fatlawi (born 1 July 1968), Iraqi politician
 Hanan al-Shaykh (born 1945), Lebanese author
 Hanan Ashrawi, Palestinian legislator, activist, and scholar
 Hanan Eshel, Israeli archaeologist
 Hanan Ibrahim, Somali activist
 Hanan Jacoby (born 1962), American economist
 Hanan Kattan, Jordanian-born, British-based film producer of Palestinian origin
 Hanan Keren (born 1952), Israeli basketball player
 Hanan Maman (born 1989), Israeli footballer
 Hanan Melcer, Israeli judge
 Hanan Porat, Israeli rabbi, educator, and politician
 Hanan Rubinstein (born December 19, 1982), Israeli-born, American musician and record producer
 Hanan Tarik (born 1994), Ethiopian film and television actress and model
 Hanan Tork, Egyptian actress

See  also
Hanan (surname)
Ian